The South Australian Railways D class was a class of 4-4-0 steam locomotives operated by the South Australian Railways.

History
In August 1859, Robert Stephenson and Company delivered two 4-4-0 locomotives to the South Australian Railways for use on the Gawler to Kapunda line. A further six were delivered between 1862 and 1867. The first was withdrawn in February 1896 with a further three withdrawn by 1904. The remaining four were used on construction trains on the Pinnaroo line. They were then used as shunters with the last withdrawn in November 1932.

References

External links

Railway locomotives introduced in 1859
Robert Stephenson and Company locomotives
D
4-4-0 locomotives
Broad gauge locomotives in Australia
Passenger locomotives 
Scrapped locomotives